Heysell María Martínez Madrigal (born 10 May 2001) is a Nicaraguan footballer who plays as a midfielder for Real Estelí FC and the Nicaragua women's national team.

Club career
Martínez has played for Somotillo FC and Real Estelí in Nicaragua.

International career
Martínez represented Nicaragua at the 2018 CONCACAF Women's U-17 Championship and 2020 CONCACAF Women's U-20 Championship. She made her senior debut on 8 April 2021 in a 2–0 friendly away win over El Salvador.

References 

2001 births
Living people
Nicaraguan women's footballers
Women's association football midfielders
Nicaragua women's international footballers